Pauline-Euphrosine Paul (5 June 1803, in Marseille – 1 August 1877, in Amiens) was a French ballet dancer.

She married the dancer Laurent-François-Alexandre Montessu in 1821 and was thus also known as Madame Montessu. She was the sister and student of the noted dancer Paul before being admitted to the Ballet de l'Opéra de Paris, where she débuted on 17 July 1820 beside him. She was première danseuse until 1836, when she retired, although she continued to put on productions here and there, notably at Amsterdam in 1840, with André Isidore Carey.

She created the roles of La Fille mal gardée (1828) and Manon Lescaut by Jean-Pierre Aumer (1830).

References

1803 births
1877 deaths
French ballerinas
Montessu
19th-century French ballet dancers